Paul Veyne (13 June 1930 – 29 September 2022) was a French archaeologist and historian, and a specialist of Ancient Rome. A student of the École Normale Supérieure and member of the École française de Rome, he was honorary professor at the Collège de France.

Biography
Veyne was born in Aix-en-Provence. From a background which he described as "uncultured", he took up archaeology and history by chance, at the age of eight, when he discovered a piece of an amphora on a Celtic site close to the village of Cavaillon. He developed a particular interest in Roman civilization since it was the best-known in the environment in which he grew up.

The family having moved to Lille, he assiduously studied the Roman collections of the archaeological museum there, where he received guidance from the curator. He maintains that his interest in the Greeks and Romans stems not from any humanist impulse or any specific admiration, but just from his chance discovery as a child.

Having come to Paris for his khâgne, he had a sudden moment of political awakening in front of the bas-relief that celebrates the liberation of the city at the bottom of the Boulevard St. Michel and joined the Communist Party of France. He left the party four years later, without ever having had a true political conviction.

On the other hand, the bad treatment of the Algerians at the hands of the colonials revolted him in equal measure to the atrocities of the Nazis. Once again, however, his shock was neither social nor political, but moral.

Paul Veyne studied at the École Normale Supérieure in Paris 1951-55. He was a member of the École française de Rome 1955-1957, whereupon he settled in Aix-en-Provence as a professor at the University of Provence. It was in his years in Aix that he published his provocative Comment on écrit l'histoire, an essay on the epistemology of history. At a time when the dominant trend in French historiography favored quantitative methods, Veyne's essay unabashedly declared history to be a "true tale". Through his essay he became an early representative of the interest in the narrative aspects of scientific history.

His monograph on Evergetism from 1975 (Le pain et le cirque), however, demonstrated that Veyne's concept of narrative somewhat differed from its common use, and that his differences with the hegemonic Annales school was smaller than what had seemed to be the case in 1970. The book is a comprehensive study of the practice of gift-giving, in the tradition of Marcel Mauss, more in line with the anthropologically influenced histoire des mentalités of the third Annalistes generation than with "old-fashioned" narrative history.

In 1975 Veyne entered the Collège de France thanks to the support of Raymond Aron, who had been abandoned by his former heir apparent Pierre Bourdieu. However, Veyne, by failing to cite the name of Aron in his inaugural lecture, aroused his displeasure, and according to Veyne he was persecuted by Aron ever since this perceived sign of his ingratitude. Veyne remained there from 1975 to 1999 as holder of the chair of Roman history.

In 1978 Veyne's epistemological essay was reissued in tandem with a new essay on Michel Foucault as a historian: "Foucault révolutionne l'histoire." In this essay Veyne moved away from the insistence on history as narrative, and focused instead on how the work of Foucault constituted a major shift in historical thinking. The essence of the Foucauldian 'revolution' was, according to Veyne, a shift of attention from 'objects' to 'practices', to highlight the way the epistemological objects were brought into being, rather than the objects themselves. With this essay Veyne established himself as an idiosyncratic and important interpreter of his colleague. The relationship between the historian of antiquities and the philosopher also influenced Foucault's turn towards antiquity in the second volume of the History of Sexuality, as well as his reading of liberalism in his public lectures (1978–79). In 2008 Veyne published a full-length book on Foucault, reworking some of the themes from his 1978 essay, expanding it to an intellectual portrait.

Paul Veyne lived in Bédoin, in the Vaucluse. He died on 29 September 2022, at the age of 92.

Honours 
 1990:  Knight of the Legion of Honour
 1995:  Officer of the National Order of Merit (France) 
 2016:  Officer of the Legion of Honour
 2016:  Commander of the Ordre des Arts et des Lettres

Awards
 1972: Prize of the Académie française
 2006: Chateaubriand Awards 
 2007: French Senate History Book Award
 2007: Grand prix Gobert
 2009: Prix Roger Caillois
 2014: Prix Femina essai
 2017: Prize of Bibliothèque nationale de France
 2021: French Senate Medal

Main publications

In French
Comment on écrit l'histoire : essai d'épistémologie, Paris Le Seuil, 1970.
Le pain et le cirque, Paris, Le Seuil, 1976.
L'inventaire des différences, Paris, Le Seuil, 1976.
Les Grecs ont-ils cru à leurs mythes ?, Paris, Le Seuil, 1983.
L'élégie érotique romaine, Paris, Le Seuil, 1983.
Histoire de la vie privée, vol. I, Paris, Le Seuil, 1987.
René Char en ses poèmes, Paris, Gallimard, 1990.
La société romaine, Paris, Le Seuil, 1991.
Sénèque, Entretiens, Lettres à Lucilius, revised translation, introduction and notes, Paris, Laffont, 1993.
Le quotidien et l'intéressant, conversations with Catherine Darbo-Peschanski, Paris, Hachette, 1995.
Les mystères du gynécée, in collaboration with F. Frontisi-Ducroux and F. Lissarrague, Paris, Gallimard, 1998.
Sexe et pouvoir à Rome, Paris, Tallandier, 2005.
L'empire gréco-romain, Paris, Le Seuil, 2005.
Foucault, sa pensée, sa personne, Paris, Albin Michel, 2008.
 Mon musée imaginaire, ou les chefs-d'œuvre de la peinture italienne, Paris, Albin Michel, Beaux livres, 2010. 
 Et dans l'éternité je ne m'ennuierai pas, Paris, Albin Michel, 2014. 
 Palmyre. L'irremplaçable trésor, Paris, Albin Michel, 2015
 La Villa des Mystères à Pompéi, Paris, Gallimard, coll. « Art et Artistes », 2016.
 Une insolite curiosité, Paris, Robert Laffont, coll. « Bouquins », 2020.

In English
 Writing History: Essay on Epistemology, Oxford, The Wesleyan Edition, 1984
 History of Private Life: From Pagan Rome to Byzantium, Harvard, Harvard University Press, 1987
 Did the Greeks Believe in Their Myths?: An Essay on the Constitutive Imagination, Chicago, University of Chicago Press, 1988
 Bread and Circuses: Historical Sociology and Political Pluralism, London, Penguin Books, 1992
 The Roman Empire, Harvard, The Belknap Press, 1997 
 Foucault: His Thought, His Character, Cambridge, Polity Press, 2003
 When Our World Became Christian: 312 - 394, Cambridge, Polity Press, 2010
 Palmyra: An Irreplaceable Treasure, Chicago, University of Chicago Press, 2017

References

This article is a translation of part of the article in French Wikipedia.

External links

 Paul Veyne on the site of the Collège de France

1930 births
2022 deaths
Academic staff of the Collège de France
École Normale Supérieure alumni
École pratique des hautes études alumni
20th-century French historians
21st-century French historians
Historians of antiquity
French scholars of Roman history
Academic staff of the University of Provence
French male non-fiction writers
Prix Roger Caillois recipients
Prix Femina essai winners
People from Aix-en-Provence
Officiers of the Légion d'honneur
Officers of the Ordre national du Mérite
Commandeurs of the Ordre des Arts et des Lettres